Zabłocie  is a village in the administrative district of Gmina Wysokie, within Lublin County, Lublin Voivodeship, in eastern Poland.

References

Villages in Lublin County